The Commonwealth Rhythmic Gymnastics Championships were held in conjunction with the 2002 Commonwealth Games since the sport not included in the Commonwealth Games programme.

The championships took place in Slough, England on 18–21 April 2002. The participating nations were:

References
 

Rhythmic Gymnastics
2002 Commonwealth Games
2002 Commonwealth Games events
Rhythmic gymnastics competitions
Sport in Slough